Curly on the Rack is a 1958 Australian play by Ru Pullan set in Rabaul after World War II.

Pullan was an experienced radio writer. The play came about from a discussion Pullan had with a friend about treasure left behind in the war.

It was presented by the Elizabethan Theatre Trust at a time when production of Australian plays was rare. It was considered a disappointment after their successful productions of The Shifting Heart and Summer of the Seventeenth Doll. Nonetheless the play was adapted for Australian radio in 1960.

Plot
After World War Two, two brothers, the tough Max and the gentler Harry, live in Rabaul with their sister Pet, salvaging war time equipment.   Their truck driver, Curly, waits for his opportunity to recover £10,000 he planted on a nearby island during the Japanese invasion along with a fellow soldier called Scobie. Scobie arrives, having lost both his legs during the war, demanding his half of the money.  Smith, a philosophical   drunk, comments on the action.

Cast of Original Production
Stewart Ginn as Scobie
John Gray as Smith
Coralie Neville as Pet Finton
Max Osbiston as Harry
Grant Taylor as Max Finton
Ken Wayne as Harry Finton
Owen Weingott 	as Tim, a ship's captain

Reception
Reviewing the original production, The Bulletin said "the  dramatic   cliches   and   tortuous  contrivings   that   go   with   resolving   the   situations   are   rather   less  than   bearable,   and   the   scene  wherein   Scobie   recovers   his  manhood   and   Max   reveals   his  yellow   streak   must   be   one   of  the   most   preposterous   bits   of  hoo-ha   served   to   an   audience  for   many   a   day."

The Sydney Morning Herald said the play "ran a wayward course through melodramatic shallows" and "had an entertaining enough adventure yarn to tell, but Mr Pullan seemed unable to develop the issues of his intriguing first act in a rich way through the stationary second, and then abandoned adventure to turn his third act into a much too rapid_, much too tritely tremulous, much too improbable study of a wrecked man's redemption into full and confident manhood." The paper's reviewer added that the "dialogue had the surface fluency to be expected of an experienced hand in day-to-dsy radio writing, but the play...had something of radio's way of forcing over-heated dramatics into situations that could seem more plausible if allowed to generate more stealthily." 

The Age said the play was "undistinguished" with "some of the most predictable action ever seen on stage".

References

External links
details of premiere production at AusStage
Curly on the Rack at AustLit
Review of initial production
Program of Original Production at Elizabethan Theatre Trust
1950s Australian plays
1958 plays